William H. Tripp Jr (1920–1971) was an American naval architect who created many popular wooden and later fiberglass sailboat designs. Tripp used the diminutive, Bill, as his usual first name.

Life
Tripp was a native of Long Island, New York. He started as a yacht designer working for Phillip Rhodes, before the Second World War. After returning from his military service in the war he worked for Sparkman & Stephens.

In 1952 Tripp started his own design firm with Bill Campbell, Tripp & Campbell, located in a small office on the seventh floor of 10 Rockefeller Plaza. One of his early wooden boat designs, a 48-foot flush-deck sloop was built by German shipbuilder Abeking and Rasmussen designed for Jack Potter of Oyster Bay, Long Island and named Touche. It accumulated a successful race record and elevated Tripp's reputation as a designer, bringing him many commissions for new boats.

Tripp began experimenting with a new material for hull construction and began designing boats for fiberglass, becoming a pioneer in the field.

Tripp was not only a designer, but also an accomplished sailor and sailed many of his own designs.

Tripp was not happy with his professional partnership with Campbell and dissolved the company and formed his own, based in his home town of Port Washington, New York. Campbell found a new partner, Dick Sheehan and carried on as Campbell/Sheehan.

Biographer Ted Jones wrote of Tripp's designs: "Thinking back, I can see many innovations Bill’s fertile imagination introduced. While he did not create the wide beam, shallow draft centerboarder  ... he surely refined the type to the extent that he became associated with centerboard racing/cruising boats. The wide transom, low counter design of his boats’ sterns were quite new in the late 1950s, causing many derisive comments among traditionalists, but I don’t hear anyone laughing about the shape of the Bermuda 40’s stern anymore ...  He designed boats to stay together under the most difficult circumstances. I cannot recall one of his designs ever being dismasted or suffering structural damage at sea."

Death
Tripp died in 1971 in an automobile accident, at age 51. Tripp was killed by a drunk driver on the Connecticut Turnpike. The other driver lost control of his car and crossed the road divider, colliding with Tripp’s Jaguar.

Tripp's son, William H. Tripp III is also a yacht designer. Biographer Ted Jones wrote, "Bill’s son, Billy, was too young at the time of his father’s death to be able to understand what it was that made his father’s boat designs special, yet he has now exceeded his father in this specialized field."

Designs

Bermuda 40-1 (Hinckley) - 1959
Bermuda 40-2 (Hinckley) - 1968
Bermuda 40-3 (Hinckley) - 1971
Block Island 40 - 1957
Block Island 40 (Migrator) - 1984
Columbia 26 Mark II - 1969
Columbia 27 - 1970
Columbia 30 - 1971
Columbia 32 - 1975
Columbia 34 Mark II - 1970
Columbia 35 - 1975
Columbia 39 - 1970
Columbia 41 - 1972
Columbia 43 - 1969
Columbia 43 CB - 1969
Columbia 43 Mark III - 1973
Columbia 45 - 1971
Columbia 45 Ketch - 1971
Columbia 50 - 1965
Columbia 52 - 1971
Columbia 56 - 1974
Columbia 57 - 1969
Coronado 27 - 1970
Coronado 32 - 1973
Coronado 34 - 1966
Coronado 35 - 1971
Coronado 35 MS - 1971
Coronado 41 - 1972
Coronado 45 - 1974
Galaxy 32 - 1957
Galaxy 32-3 - 1970
Grampian 46 - 1969
Hinckley 48 - 1965
Hughes 36 - 1971
Hughes-Columbia 36 - 1979
Invicta (Tripp) - 1960
Invicta II (Tripp) - 1964
Javelin 38 (Tripp) - 1960
Le Comte 52 - 1965
Le Comte ALC 35 - 1968
Le Comte ALC 35 Mark II - 1971
Le Comte Medalist 33 Mark I - 1962
Le Comte Medalist 33 Mark II - 1965
Le Comte Ocean Racer 52 - 1968
Mercer 44 - 1959
Northeast 38-1 - 1962
Northeast 38-2 - 1966
Northeast 38-3 - 1969
Oceanic 48 (Tripp) - 1962
Paceship 32 (Tripp) - 1968
Polaris 26 (Tripp) - 1960
Tripp Resolute - 1955
Sailcrafter 32 - 1977
Sailcrafter 50 - 1971
Sailmaster 26 - 1963
Santander 30 (Tripp) - 1966
Seafarer 31 Mark I - 1968
Seafarer 31 Mark I Yawl - 1968
Seaman 30 - 1955
Tripp 30 (Seafarer) - 1963
Tripp Lentsch 29 - 1963
US Yachts US 41 - 1963
US Yachts US 46 - 1968
Watkins 32 - 1982
Watkins 33 - 1984
Watkins 36 - 1981
Watkins 36C - 1981

References

William H. Tripp Jr